The subdesert brush warbler (Nesillas lantzii), also known as Lantz's brush-warbler, is a species of Old World warbler in the family Acrocephalidae.  It is found only in Madagascar.

References

subdesert brush warbler
Endemic birds of Madagascar
subdesert brush warbler
Taxonomy articles created by Polbot